Tom Clancy's Net Force is a novel series, created by Tom Clancy and Steve Pieczenik and originally written by Steve Perry. The original series ceased publication in 2006. There was also a spin-off of young adult books called Net Force Explorers. The series was rebooted in 2019 with the Dark Web novel by Jerome Preisler.

General
Tom Clancy's Net Force is aimed at an adult audience, while the related series Net Force Explorers (which follows the adventures of a teen auxiliary of the Net Force in 2025) is aimed at the older teen market.

The initial Net Force concept was alluded to in the third Op-Center novel, Games of State; given that Net Force was created by the same two men who created the Op-Center series, it can be assumed that they occur in the same universe. However, no direct connection has yet been drawn between the two.

Main characters

These characters are in most or all books:

Original series

The books in the Tom Clancy's Net Force series so far are:

Relaunch series

The books in the Tom Clancy's Net Force Relaunch series so far are:

In other media

The first book of the series, Net Force, was adapted and altered into a made-for-TV film in 1999, starring Scott Bakula as Alex Michaels and Joanna Going as Toni Fiorella.

References

 
Book series introduced in 1998
Novel series
Techno-thriller novels